John Ossowski (born 10 February 1962) is a Canadian rower. He competed in the men's coxless four event at the 1988 Summer Olympics.

References

External links
 

1962 births
Living people
Canadian male rowers
Olympic rowers of Canada
Rowers at the 1988 Summer Olympics
Sportspeople from Etobicoke
Rowers from Toronto